The White Eagle is a 1928 Soviet silent drama film directed by Yakov Protazanov and starring Vasili Kachalov, Anna Sten and Vsevolod Meyerhold. Set in Tsarist times, it is based on the play The Governor by Leonid Andreyev.

Plot
The film takes place in 1905. Governor-liberal attempts to prevent a strike in the city but the workers refuse to obey. The governor gives an order to shoot the strikers and suppresses the uprising with force while children die in the crossfire. As a reward, he is represented with the order of "White Eagle", but the governor is haunted by pangs of conscience.

Cast
 Vasili Kachalov as Governor  
 Anna Sten as Governor's wife  
 Vsevolod Meyerhold as Dignitary  
 Ivan Chuvelyov
 Andrey Petrovsky as Chief of Police  
 Pyotr Repnin as Bishop  
 Ye. Volkonskaya 
 Mikhail Zharov
 Yuri Vasilchikov 
 Aleksandr Gromov as Revolutionary

References

Bibliography 
 Christie, Ian & Taylor, Richard. The Film Factory: Russian and Soviet Cinema in Documents 1896-1939. Routledge, 2012.

External links 
 

Films directed by Yakov Protazanov
Films based on works by Leonid Andreyev
Soviet drama films
Soviet silent feature films
1920s Russian-language films
Soviet black-and-white films
1928 drama films
1928 films
Silent drama films